Team Flanders–Baloise is a professional cycling team based in Belgium that participates in UCI Continental Circuits races and when selected as a wildcard to UCI World Tour events. The team is managed by Christophe Sercu, with Roger Swerts, Walter Planckaert and Jean-Pierre Heynderickx assisting as a directeur sportif.

Team roster

Major wins

National champions
2006
 Belgium Road Race Championships, Niko Eeckhout
2015
 Belgium Road Race Championships, Preben Van Hecke

Bike sponsor
Since 1994, Topsport Vlaanderen and its predecessors are sponsored by Eddy Merckx Cycles. They currently ride with the company's flagship bike, the EMX-525.

References

External links

UCI Professional Continental teams
Cycling teams based in Belgium
Cycling teams established in 1994